Plant, Cell & Environment is a monthly peer-reviewed scientific journal published by Wiley-Blackwell. The editor-in-chief is Anna Amtmann (University of Glasgow).

History
The journal was established in 1978 by editor-in-chief Harry Smith (University of Nottingham), together with Paul Gordon Jarvis (University of Aberdeen), David Jennings (University of Liverpool), John Raven (University of Dundee), and Bob Campbell (Blackwell Scientific).

Abstracting and indexing
The journal is abstracted and indexed in:

According to the Journal Citation Reports, the journal has a 2021 impact factor of 7.947.

References

External links

Wiley-Blackwell academic journals
Botany journals
English-language journals
Monthly journals
Publications established in 1978